Curt Roggow (born December 22, 1966) is an American politician who served in the Oklahoma House of Representatives from the 41st district from 1998 to 2006.

References

1966 births
Living people
Republican Party members of the Oklahoma House of Representatives